The men's sanda 60 kg at the 1998 Asian Games in Bangkok, Thailand was held from 16 to 19 December at the Thammasat Gymnasium 6.

Schedule
All times are Indochina Time (UTC+07:00)

Results

References

External links
Official website

Men's sanda 60 kg